Trần Thiêm Bình (?–1406) was a pretender to the Vietnamese throne during Hồ dynasty. He was mentioned as Chen Tian-ping (陳天平) in Chinese records.

Trần Thiêm Bình was a fake prince, and his real name was Nguyễn Khang (阮康) or Trần Khang (陳康). Bùi Bá Kỳ, a high official of Trần dynasty whom exiled to Ming China, did not know him. Bình was a house servant of Trần Nguyên Huy. He launched a rebellion against Trần dynasty, and was defeated in 1390. He then fled to Ming China and changed his name to Trần Thiêm Bình.

In 1404, Bình arrived at the Ming imperial court in Nanjing, claiming to be a Trần prince, appealing to the court for the restoration of Trần dynasty. In 1406, Yongle Emperor of Ming China, sent 5000 men to escort him back to Vietnam. Ming army led by Huang Zhong (黃中) was ambushed by Vietnamese army in Chi Lăng, and suffered a crushing defeat. Huang Zhong fled back to China, and Trần Thiêm Bình was captured. He was executed by Hồ Quý Ly.

This incident made Yongle angry. Finally, Yongle decided to invade Vietnam.

References

 

1406 deaths
Pretenders to the Vietnamese throne
Impostor pretenders
Trần dynasty
People executed by Vietnam
Executed Vietnamese people